Catholicos Sarkis I was the Catholicos of the Armenian Apostolic Church between 992 and 1019. He was said to be mild mannered and humble, so that even as leader of the church he lived simply like a hermit. 
A terrible earthquake struck the land around the fourth year of his reign. The dormant sect of anti-clerical Tondrakians was revived during Sarkis's reign and he condemned it as anathema. He died shortly after and was succeeded by Peter I of Armenia, brother of the previous Catholicos Khachig I. 

Catholicoi of Armenia
10th-century Armenian people
11th-century Armenian people
11th-century Oriental Orthodox archbishops
10th-century Oriental Orthodox archbishops